Óscar Saavedra San Martín (29 June 1940 – 8 April 2018), was a Bolivian physicist and academic.

Born in La Paz, in the capital of Bolivia, he got a PhD in Physics from the University of Milan, Italy in 1964, for his thesis developed at the EURATOM (Nuclear Research Center of Europe): "No conservation of parity in strong interactions" (Parity non conservation in Strong Interactions). His scientific activity has focused on the physics of cosmic radiation and the physics of astroparticles. His articles and reports have been published in most of the international journals of Physics and Astrophysics. He was an internationally renowned astrophysicist and his work makes him the pride of his country, Bolivia.

 Between 1966 and 1968 he was director of the Chacaltaya Cosmic Physics Laboratory and received the Order of the Condor of the Andes, the highest distinction of Bolivia.

He had been professor in University of Torino, Higher University of San Andrés, University of Tokyo and University of Kiel.

References

1940 births
2018 deaths
People from La Paz
Bolivian scientists
Bolivian physicists